Wendell Helms Fleming (born March 7, 1928) is an American mathematician, specializing in geometrical analysis and stochastic differential equations.

Fleming received in 1951 his PhD under Laurence Chisholm Young at the University of Wisconsin–Madison with a thesis entitled Boundary and related notions for generalized parametric surfaces. Fleming was a professor at Brown University, where he retired in 2009 as professor emeritus.

Fleming was with Herbert Federer a pioneer of geometric measure theory. Later in his career, he worked on stochastic processes, stochastic differential equations and their applications in control theory. In 1976–1977 he was a Guggenheim Fellow. In 1982 he gave a plenary address (Optimal control of Markov Processes) at the ICM in Warsaw.

Awards and honors 
In 1987 he received with Federer the Leroy P. Steele Prize of the American Mathematical Society. In 1994 he won the Reid Prize from the Society for Industrial and Applied Mathematics. He was given an honorary doctorate at Purdue University in 1991. In 2006 he received the Isaacs Award. In 2012 he became a fellow of the American Mathematical Society. In May 2012 his election to membership in the United States National Academy of Sciences was announced.

Selected works 
.
. The first paper of Federer and Fleming illustrating their approach to the theory of perimeters based on the theory of currents.
 with Raymond W. Rishel: Deterministic and stochastic optimal control, Springer, Berlin Heidelberg New York 1975, 
 Functions of several variables, Addison Wesley, 1965, Springer, 2nd edition 1977
 with Halil Mete Soner: Controlled Markov Processes and Viscosity Solutions, Springer, 1992, 2nd edition 2006

References

External links 
 
 Wendell H. Fleming – Homepage at Brown University

1928 births
Living people
20th-century American mathematicians
21st-century American mathematicians
Fellows of the American Mathematical Society
Members of the United States National Academy of Sciences
People from Guthrie, Oklahoma
Mathematicians from Oklahoma
University of Wisconsin–Madison alumni
Brown University faculty